Michelle Calvó Pedreira, better known as Michelle Calvó, (Madrid, September 19, 1991) is a Spanish actress known for her role as Eli in the film El club de los incomprendidos and for playing Sofía Contreras in Amar es para siempre. In 2019 she played Paula Campillo in the series Secretos de estado.

Biography 
Michelle Calvó, born in Madrid and raised in Tenerife, studied at the Juan Codina acting school and later took casting and acting courses with Juan León, Jordi Frades, Eva Leira, Yolanda Serrano, Andrés Cuenca and Álvaro Haro. More recently she has taken an acting and audiovisual training course with Sara Torres. She was a member of the School's theater group for five years.

Michelle has played episodic roles in series such as Toledo, cruce de destinos or Aída and has participated in numerous music videos and short films, such as Candela, for which she received the award for best performance and the audience award at the Ibicine Festival. His popularity, however, came from the hand of El club de los incomprendidos. Later, in 2015 she signed on as the protagonist in Amar es para siempre for its fourth season.

In June 2017, she became known for her participation in the second season of Yo quisiera. In July 2017 she signed on as a collaborator of Zapeando, a program in which she participates occasionally. In addition, in October 2017 she began filming Secretos de Estado, the new series of Telecinco, alongside Miryam Gallego, Jesús Castro, Estefanía de los Santos and Miquel Fernández. 

In 2020 she played in the premiere of Desaparecidos, produced by Plano a Plano and Telecinco alongside Maxi Iglesias, Elvira Minguez and Juan Echanove and participated in the Italian Gli orologi del diavolo.

In 2021, she was announced for the third season of Madres.Amor y vida, alongside Belén Rueda, Carmen Ruiz and Hiba Abouk, among others.

Filmography

Cinema

Television

Videoclips 

 «No pide tanto, idiota», by Maldita Nerea (2015).
 «No saben de ti», by  Andrés Suárez  (2015).
 «Elévate», by Dan Silva.
 «Sopla el viento», by Pignoise.
 «Sigo escuchándote», by Josel Casas.
 «Ohe , Oha vas a soñar», by Sarah Sofìa.

References

External links 
 Michelle Calvó on IMDb

21st-century Spanish actresses
Living people
1991 births
Actresses from the Canary Islands
Spanish television actresses
Spanish film actresses